"Let It Fade" is a song by contemporary Christian musician Jeremy Camp from his album Beyond Measure. The song was written by Jeremy Camp and Adam Watts and was released as a single in early 2008, and in April it became a No. 1 hit in the U.S. on Christian adult contemporary radio.

Compilation and live
This song was also the compilation album WOW Hits 2009 and the 2009 live version album Jeremy Camp Live.

Music video
The music video for the single "Let It Fade" was released on December 7, 2008. The video features Camp performing the song and a woman looking through old photographs.

Charts

Weekly charts

Year-end charts

References

2008 singles
Jeremy Camp songs
Song recordings produced by Ron Aniello
2006 songs
Songs written by Adam Watts (musician)
Songs written by Jeremy Camp